The Fender Musicmaster Bass is a model of electric bass guitar, produced by Fender between 1971 and 1981.

As with its six-string counterpart, which was a stripped-down version of the Fender Mustang, the Musicmaster Bass is a simpler version of the Mustang Bass. It features a short  scale.  All of the Musicmaster's electronics are mounted onto a single piece of plastic.

Like many of Fender's other budget-priced guitars, the Musicmaster Bass used many surplus parts from other Fender models. The bodies were leftover Fender Mustang Bass bodies, while the pickups were six-pole guitar pickups, rather than four-pole bass pickups. Many players modified the bodies of their Musicmaster basses to accommodate Precision-style double pickups or enhanced electronics.

The Musicmaster Bass was introduced in 1971, and originally came in either black, red or white finish. Some very early issues were Daphne Blue with pearl pickguards. Later, this was expanded to include many of the finishes present on other Fender guitars. Earlier models are distinguishable by their small headstock logo, lack of a serial number on the headstock, and small, triangular tuning keys; later models feature a much larger headstock logo, with a serial number silkscreened next to the "Fender" logo, and Mustang-style tuning keys.

The Musicmaster Bass was discontinued along with all of Fender's budget-priced models in 1981, with the introduction of the Fender Bullet Bass. They were reissued briefly by Squier in 1997 (Squier Vista Series). This model had strings through the body and four polepieces pickup. However, it was discontinued after only a year of production, and replaced with the Squier Bronco Bass, but retaining the six-pole pickup. Today, with the rise of indie and punk rock, vintage Musicmaster basses are becoming more collectible among Fender's vintage bass guitars, but are still much more affordable than many comparable vintage Fender models.

Users
 Tina Weymouth
 Jim O'Rourke and Kim Gordon (Sonic Youth)
 Brian Gordon (The Shows)
 Dennis Spaag (M.O.T.O.)
 Colin Moulding (XTC)
 Ben Flashman from Comets on Fire used an all-black Musicmaster bass before the band went on hiatus in 2008.
 Ritchie Blackmore during the "Long Live Rock 'n' Roll" album sessions (on tracks 1, 2, 3 and 6 only) 
 Jessy Bulbo (Ultrasónicas)
 Lucas Martins (CéU)
 Mike Dirnt
 Dee Dee Ramone (The Ramones)
 Alan Lancaster (Status Quo)
 Hans van Reijswoud (Galaxis, Gharp)
 Pat Brinkley (O'Beast, Dynaflo)
 Mac DeMarco
 Jon Lent (Mac DeMarco)
 Jenni Roberts (Faith Healer (band), TOPS, Renny Wilson)
 Evan Brack (The Fair Weathered)
 Katy Goodman (La Sera, Vivian Girls)
 Peter Timusk (Mechanic City Psychos)
 Philippe DAUGA (BIJOU)
 Ron Strykert (Men at Work)
 Corinne Mariennau (TELEPHONE)
 Dale Ryan (Deer Tick) Plays a more rare left handed model.
 Samuel Koisser (Peace (band)) plays a left handed model.
 Matt Armstrong (Bill Fay, Kenny Process Team)
 Alex Bleeker (Real Estate)
Jacob Portrait (Unknown Mortal Orchestra)
 Chris Gari. Jayne County band (Electric Chairs)
 Mariano Diaz (Tangerina)
Dimas Oriza (Texpack)
 Tom McClung (WU LYF) played one.
 Gabe Nelson (Cake)
 Jack Dolan (Twin Peaks)
 AI (VorVox)
 Arnaud Larcier (Billions of comrades)
 Joe Sampson (Bad Weather California)
 Ege Kuzubasioglu (Basic Shape)
 Ian Bannister (Stonebowl UK )
 Adam Yauch (Beastie Boys)
 Marty Holoubek (Sex on Toast)
 Bill Satek (Lechuguillas)
 Ray Magnan (J.Lightning, Headstone, the Rex Mangrove Band)
 Brian Murphy (Alvvays)
 Sally Lee (Long Branch)
 Eamon Sandwith (The Chats)
 Rob Smith (The Bad McCree's)
 Lucas Oliveira (Maglore)
 Lucas Skinner (King Gizzard & the Lizard Wizard)
 Nick Campbell (Pomplamoose)
 Vanja Von Sek
 Brace Belden

References

External links

Musicmaster
1971 musical instruments
Musical instruments invented in the 1970s